Kim Ju-sung (born 12 December 2000) is a South Korean footballer who plays as a defender for FC Seoul and the South Korea national team.

Club career 
Kim Ju-sung joined FC Seoul in 2019. He made his K League 1 debut on 13 July 2019.

International career 
Kim Ju-sung was selected to play for the South Korea under-20 team at the 2019 FIFA U-20 World Cup.

Kim Ju-sung was part of the South Korea squad at the 2022 EAFF E-1 Football Championship.

Career statistics

Club
As of 5 March 2023

Honours

International
South Korea U20
FIFA U-20 World Cup Runner-up: 2019

References

External links
 

2000 births
Living people
South Korean footballers
Association football defenders
K League 1 players
K League 2 players
FC Seoul players
Gimcheon Sangmu FC players
South Korea under-17 international footballers
South Korea under-20 international footballers